Sened may refer to:

Sened (town), Tunisia
Sened (language), an extinct Berber language

See also
Senedd, Wales's devolved legislature
Senedd building, where it meets